Bao Saifei (born ) is a Chinese male  track cyclist. He competed at the 2009 UCI Track Cycling World Championships, 2010 UCI Track Cycling World Championships, 2011 UCI Track Cycling World Championships and 2015 UCI Track Cycling World Championships. He won the silver medal in the  team sprint  at the 2016 Asian Cycling Championships.

References

External links
 
 

1989 births
Living people
Chinese track cyclists
Chinese male cyclists
Place of birth missing (living people)
Cyclists at the 2014 Asian Games
Asian Games medalists in cycling
Asian Games silver medalists for China
Asian Games bronze medalists for China
Medalists at the 2014 Asian Games
21st-century Chinese people